Star Climbing is the fourth studio album by Zoot Woman. It was released through Embassy One Records in 2014.

Critical reception

At Metacritic, which assigns a weighted average score out of 100 to reviews from mainstream critics, the album received an average score of 60 based on 4 reviews, indicating "mixed or average reviews".

Track listing

Personnel
Credits adapted from liner notes.

Zoot Woman
 Adam Blake
 Johnny Blake
 Stuart Price

Technical personnel
 Haberdashery – art direction, design

Charts

References

External links
 
 

2014 albums
Zoot Woman albums
Albums produced by Stuart Price